Dormition may refer to:

 Dormition of the Mother of God, a major religious feast in Eastern Christianity
 Dormition of Saint Anne, a minor religious feast in Eastern Christianity

See also
 Dormition of the Mother of God (disambiguation)
 Church of the Dormition of the Theotokos (disambiguation)
 Cathedral of the Dormition of the Theotokos (disambiguation)